Juan Carlos Tapia Tapia (born 8 August 1977) is a Chilean former professional footballer who played as a defender for clubs in Chile and Indonesia.

Career
A product of Unión Española youth system, Tapia was well-known by his impetuosity. He made appearances for the club in 1996 and 1997.

In Chile, he also played for Deportes La Serena and Unión San Felipe (2002–03).

In 2003 he went to Indonesia and joined Persik Kediri coincided with his compatriots Claudio Villan and Alejandro Bernal and won the league title in 2003. He also scored a goal in the 2004 AFC Champions League against Seongnam FC.

He also played for PSSB Bireuen and Pelita KS.

Personal life
Previously to move to Indonesia, Tapia worked as a ceramic installer in his homeland.

Honours
Persik Kediri
 Liga Indonesia Premier Division: 2003

References

External links
 

1977 births
Living people
Place of birth missing (living people)
Chilean footballers
Chilean expatriate footballers
Unión Española footballers
Deportes La Serena footballers
Unión San Felipe footballers
Persik Kediri players
PSSB Bireuen players
Pelita Jaya FC players
Madura United F.C. players
Chilean Primera División players
Primera B de Chile players
Indonesian Premier Division players
Chilean expatriate sportspeople in Indonesia
Expatriate footballers in Indonesia
Association football defenders